Green Park City is one of the neighborhoods of  Bin QasimTown in Karachi, Sindh, Pakistan.

There are several ethnic groups in Green Park City including Hazarewal are the 70% of total population of green park city & Sindhis, Kashmiris, Seraikis, Pakhtuns,  Balochs, Brahuis , Memons, Bohras, Christians and Ismailis.

References

External links 
 

Neighbourhoods of Karachi